Eleni Chatzi (born 1981) is a Greek civil engineer, researcher, and an Associate Professor and Chair of Structural Mechanics and Monitoring at the Department of Civil, Environmental and Geomatic Engineering of the Swiss Federal Institute of Technology in Zurich.

Education 

Chatzi earned her diploma and master's degree MSc in Civil Engineering with honors from the Department of Civil Engineering at the National Technical University of Athens (NTUA). In 2010 she obtained her PhD Degree with distinction from the Department of Civil Engineering & Engineering Mechanics at Columbia University.

Work 
In 2010 Chatzi was hired as the youngest Assistant Professor at ETH Zurich, and was promoted to an Associate Professor in 2017.  Chatzi builds data-driven decision-support tools for structures, infrastructures and engineered systems at-large. She exploits information that is latent in structural response data, which can be recorded through appropriate monitoring schemes such as vibration, strain, ultrasonic systems, and more. Her research follows a hybrid modeling approach, coupling physics-based simulation tools with data stemming from monitoring observations for intelligent and data-driven diagnostics and prognostics of engineered systems. The goal lies in providing actionable tools able to guide operators and engineers in the management of their assets. Her expertise lies in the area of Structural Health Monitoring, with applications extending across a range of systems including civil, mechanical and aerospace structures and components. She has delivered a number of works on the state/parameter state/input and state/input/parameter identification of dynamical systems, relying on novel Bayesian filtering formulations. On the hybrid modeling front, Chatzi's work involves a set of approaches for reducing physics-based simulations, drawing from structural mechanics of complex phenomena (plasticity/nonlinear dynamics/fracture), so that these may be fused with data - possibly on the fly, as data is attained. This includes work on computational hysteretic multiscale schemes, schemes for increasing accuracy and stability in fracture simulations, substructuring schemes as well as Model Order Reduction schemes with parametric dependencies. The aspect of parametrization, is vital in accounting for structural operation under continually changing environments, namely varying Environmental and Operational Conditions.  Chatzi has delivered an array of works on dynamic system metamodels (or surrogates) that incorporate uncertainties by employing stochastic tools, such as Polynomial Chaos Expansions and machine learning approaches such as random forests and variational autoencoders, to this end. Such models can then be used for the purpose of virtualization, which encompasses definition of digital twin models, online monitoring and control, as well as real-time diagnostics & prognostics.

Chatzi is an author of over 250 papers in peer-reviewed journals and conference proceedings, and further serves as an editor for international journals in the domains of Dynamics and Structural Health Monitoring, including the Journal of Sound and Vibration, Structure & Infrastructure Engineering, the Journal of Structural Engineering, Mechanical Systems and Signal Processing, the Journal of Engineering Mechanics, as well as the Sections on Structural Sensing and Computational Methods in Structural Engineering of Frontiers in Built Environment. Since 2016, she has been coordinating the joint ETH Zürich & University of Zurich PhD Programme in Computational Science. Her work on use of monitoring toward self-aware infrastructures has been honored with the Walter L. Huber Civil Engineering research Prize, awarded by the American Society of Civil Engineering.

Awards 
2020             	EASD Junior Research Prize in the area of Computational Structural Dynamics, awarded by the European Association of Structural Dynamics (EASD)
2020 ASCE Walter L. Huber Civil Engineering Research Prize
2019 Best paper of the year award, ASCE Journal of Architectural Engineering
2019 Telford Premium Prize
2019 TUM-IAS Hans Fischer Fellowship awarded by the TÜV Süd Foundation
2016 T. Francis Ogilvie Young Investigator Lecture award, awarded by the Center for Ocean Engineering, Massachusetts Institute of Technology (MIT)
2015 ERC Starting Grant Award
2009 The Mindlin Award - Department of Civil Engineering and Engineering Mechanics in Columbia University
2006 Fulbright Scholarship

References

External links 
 Eleni Chatzi profile at the website of ETH Zurich
 

1981 births
Living people
Greek civil engineers
Greek women archaeologists
National Technical University of Athens alumni
Columbia School of Engineering and Applied Science alumni